Lorna Yabsley (born 19 July 1964 in Salcombe) is a British former actress, photographer and author, who pioneered the "reportage" style of wedding photography during the early 1990s.

As a teenager she attended Bush Davies School of Theatre Arts in East Grinstead and Elmhurst School for Dance in Camberley, Surrey. She also spent much of this time acting in television dramas and serials. She starred in the Tales of the Unexpected episode "The Flypaper", which became a cult favorite. She adopted the stage name Lorna Charles in 1980, and starred alongside Brenda Blethyn and Harriet Walter in the Richard Eyre-directed Play for Today edition The Imitation Game.

Her career in photography started at the age of 18, when she began working as an assistant for landscape photographer Charlie Waite. Together they set up the specialist photo library Landscape Only.

Bibliography 
 Yabsley, Lorna – Dream Wedding Photography – publisher David and Charles May 2010 /  hardback  paperback
 Yabsley, Lorna – Introduction to Wedding Photography: A Guide to Photographing the Big Day – publisher David and Charles July 2012 /  paperback
 Yabsley, Lorna – The Busy Girl's Guide to Digital Photography – publisher David and Charles October 2013 /  paperback
 Yabsley, Lorna – Tate: The Photography Ideas Book (The Art Ideas Books) - publisher Ilex Press October 2019 /  paperback

Filmography (sometimes credited as Lorna Charles)

References

External links 
 
 Lorna Yabsley filmography at the British Film Institute
 Lorna Charles filmography at the British Film Institute
 Tales of the Unexpected at Mondo Digital
 Armchair Thriller at Nostalgia Central
 Armchair Thriller Fansite
 Tattoo Art – Close to the Heart feature at BBC Devon

1964 births
Photographers from Devon
Living people
English television actresses
People from South Hams (district)
People educated at the Elmhurst School for Dance
Actresses from Devon